Archon: The Light and the Dark is a 1983 video game developed by Free Fall Associates and one of the first five games published by Electronic Arts. It is superficially similar to chess, in that it takes place on a board with alternating black and white squares; however, instead of fixed rules when landing on another player's piece, an arcade-style fight takes place to determine the victor, and each piece has different combat abilities.  The health of the player's piece is enhanced when landing on a square of one's own color.

Archon was originally written for the Atari 8-bit family and then ported to the Apple II, Commodore 64, Amstrad CPC, ZX Spectrum, Amiga, IBM PC (as a self-booting disk), Mac, PC-88, and NES. It was designed by Paul Reiche III (who also created the graphics for the game) and Jon Freeman and programmed by Anne Westfall.

A sequel was released in 1984: Archon II: Adept.

Gameplay

The goal of the game is either to occupy five power points located on the board, to eliminate all the opposing pieces, or to eliminate all but one remaining imprisoned piece of the opponent's.  Accomplishing any one of these goals results in a win.

While the board is visually similar to a chessboard, when one piece lands on the same space as an opposing piece, the removal of the targeted piece is not automatic. Instead, the two pieces are placed into a full-screen 'combat arena' and must battle (action-style, with the players operating the combatants) to determine who takes the square.  A stronger piece will generally defeat a weaker piece, but not always, and a fight can result in both pieces being eliminated. This uncertainty adds a level of complexity to the game. Different pieces have different abilities in the combat phase. These include movement, lifespan, and weapon. The weapons vary by range, speed, rate of firing, and power. For example, the pawn (represented by knights on the 'light' side and goblins on the 'dark' side) attacks quickly, but has very little strength; its weapon, a sword or club, has limited reach and power. A dragon is stronger and can attack from a distance, while a golem moves slowly and fires a slow but powerful boulder.

A piece's powers are affected by the square on which the battle takes place, with each player having an advantage on squares of their own color. Many squares on the board oscillate between light and dark, making them dangerous to hold over time. The three middle power points are on oscillating squares.

Some pieces have special abilities. The phoenix can turn into a ball of fire, both damaging the enemy and shielding itself from enemy attacks. The shapeshifter assumes the shape and abilities of whatever piece it is up against. MikroBitti magazine once wrote that the phoenix and the shapeshifter facing each other usually end up as the most boring battle in the entire game; both combatants' capabilities are simultaneously offensive and defensive, and they tend to use it whenever they meet each other, and thus both rarely get damaged.

Each side also has a spellcaster piece, who are the leaders: the sorceress for the dark side and the wizard for the light side. The sorceress and the wizard can cast seven different spells. Each spell may be used only once per game by each spellcaster.

The computer opponent slowly adapts over time to help players defeat it. The game is usually won when either one side destroys all the opposing pieces or one of the sides is able to occupy all of the five power points.  More rarely, a side may also win by imprisoning its opponent's last remaining piece. If each side has but a single piece, and the two pieces destroy each other in combat, then the game ends in a tie.

Reception
Archon was very well received. Softline praised the game's originality, stating, "If there is any computer game that even slightly resembles Archon, we haven't seen it". The magazine concluded that "it's an announcement that Free Fall does games. And it does them well". Video magazine reviewed the game in its "Arcade Alley" column where reviewers described it as "truly a landmark in the development of computerized strategy games" and suggested that "no review could possibly do more than hint at [Archon] manifold excellence". Computer Gaming Worlds reviewer called Archon "a very good game, with lots of care put into its development. I recommend it highly". The magazine said of the Atari version that it "is a good first step towards what will be an exciting new class of game. Its play, despite the lack of depth or variation that will be possible, is fast moving". It said of the Amiga version, "if you are interested in a challenging strategy game, I recommend both Archon and Adept."

Orson Scott Card reviewed the game for Compute! in 1983. He gave Archon and two other EA games, M.U.L.E. and Worms?, complimentary reviews, writing that "they are original; they do what they set out to do very, very well; they allow the player to take part in the creativity; they do things that only computers can do". Leo LaPorte of Hi-Res—a tournament chess player—unfavorably compared the complexity of its rules to that of chess and Go, but concluded that Archon was "a very good game" that "struck a fine balance between a strategy game and an arcade shoot-'em-up". BYTEs reviewer called Archon one of the best computer games he has ever played, stating it was "rewarding and varied enough to be played again and again." The Addison-Wesley Book of Atari Software 1984 gave the game an overall A+ rating, describing it as "one of the most creative and original games that has come along in several years ... It has great graphics, and will give a lifetime of pleasure."

In 1984 Softline readers named Archon the most popular Atari program of 1983. It was awarded "1984 Most Innovative Video Game/Computer Game" at the 5th annual Arkie Awards, where judges noted that "few games make better use of a computer's special abilities than Archon". In 1996, Computer Gaming World ranked Archon as the 20th best game of all time. It was also ranked as the 50th top game by IGN in 2003, who called it a "perfect marriage of strategy and action".  The reviewer commented, "Whether on the computer or NES, Archon is an intense, engaging match of wits and reflexes, and boasts some of the coolest battles in gaming history." In 2004, Archon was inducted into GameSpot's list of the greatest games of all time. They also highlighted it among their ten games that should be remade. In 2005, IGN ranked it again as their 77th greatest game.

Legacy
Free Fall developed a sequel for the same platforms, Archon II: Adept, released by Electronic Arts in 1984. Ten years later an enhanced version of the original was published by Strategic Simulations as Archon Ultra.

The original game was rewritten for Palm OS in 2000 by Carsten Magerkurth, who contacted members Free Fall Associates for feedback on creating an improved version released in 2003.

Archon: Evolution used code from the original 8-bit version with the blessing of Jon Freeman.

In 2008, React Games acquired the license from Free Fall to develop the Archon title across multiple platforms. It released an iPhone version in June 2009. A follow-up title Archon: Conquest was released in October 2009 for the iPhone. Archon: Classic for Windows was released in November 2010 with gameplay elements not in the original game.

Archon influenced Reiche's game Star Control, which featured a similar combination of turn based strategy and real-time combat.

An updated version of the game has been announced for release exclusively for the Intellivision Amico.

See also
 Mortal Kombat: Deception, has a Chess Kombat mini game that is very similar, with almost the same rules.
 The Unholy War, a 1998 PlayStation game with a similar structure.
 Wrath Unleashed, a 2004 PlayStation 2 and Xbox game with a similar structure.

References

External links 

Archon at c64sets.com - images of the package and manual.
A reverse engineering of Archon

1983 video games
Amiga games
Amstrad CPC games
Apple II games
Ariolasoft games
Atari 8-bit family games
Commodore 64 games
Digital board games
Electronic Arts franchises
Electronic Arts games
Fighting games
FM-7 games
Classic Mac OS games
NEC PC-8801 games
NEC PC-9801 games
Turn-based strategy video games
Sharp MZ games
Sharp X1 games
ZX Spectrum games